Babino is a rural locality (a village) in Zhityovskoye Rural Settlement, Syamzhensky District, Vologda Oblast, Russia. The population was 25 in year 2002.

Geography 
Babino is located 28 km southwest of Syamzha (the district's administrative centre) by road. Podlesnaya is the nearest rural locality.

References 

Rural localities in Syamzhensky District